National Highway 730C, commonly referred to as NH 730C is a national highway in India. It is a secondary route of National Highway 30.  NH-730C runs in the state of Uttar Pradesh in India.

Route 
NH730C connects Bisalpur, Miranpur Katra(Tehsil Tilhar), Fatehgarh and Bewar in the state of Uttar Pradesh.

Junctions  
 
  Terminal near Bisalpur.
  near town Miranpur Katra Tehsil Tilhar
  Terminal near Bewar.

See also 
 List of National Highways in India
 List of National Highways in India by state

References

External links 

 NH 730C on OpenStreetMap

National highways in India
National Highways in Uttar Pradesh